Mount Qiyun is a mountain and national park located in Xiuning County in Anhui Province, China.

Culture
Through Chinese history, Chinese poets and writers including Li Bai, Tang Yin and Yu Dafu have visited Mount Qiyun either to compose poetry or to leave an inscription.

References

Tourist attractions in Anhui
Taoism in China
Qiyun
Qiyunshan
Qiyunshan
Major National Historical and Cultural Sites in Anhui
Qiyun